Northwest Theological Seminary was a theological seminary in the Reformed Christian tradition located in Lynnwood, Washington. It closed in 2018.

Founding
Northwest Theological Seminary was founded in 2000 in Lynnwood, Washington. There had long been a desire to bring a Reformed theological seminary to the Pacific Northwest that would ably train men for gospel ministry. Northwest Theological Seminary was charged with emphasizing biblical theology in the tradition of Geerhardus Vos, presuppositional apologetics in the tradition of Cornelius Van Til, and orthodox confessionalism in the classic Calvinistic tradition. After a year of prayer and preparation by the board of directors, faculty, staff, students and numerous supporters, Northwest opened its doors at Lynnwood Orthodox Presbyterian Church in Lynnwood, Washington on September 4, 2001.

Distinctives
The education of Northwest Theological Seminary is built on the following principles: the inerrancy of the Bible, the centrality of Christ, the biblical-theological method of teaching the Word of God, the presuppositional apologetics of Cornelius Van Til, the orthodox confessionalism of the classical Calvinistic tradition, and Reformed presbyterianism. The seminary's doctrine is firmly founded in the Bible and classic (orthodox) Presbyterian canons (the Westminster Standards and the Three Forms of Unity).

Academics
Northwest Theological Seminary offers two programs of study: the Master of Divinity (M.Div.) and the Master of Theological Studies (M.T.S.). The seminary publishes its own journal Kerux: The Journal of Northwest Theological Seminary that prints biblical-theological material in the Reformed/Calvinistic tradition.

Master of Divinity 
The M.Div. is a 3-year program that equips qualified men pursuing ordination with the necessary preaching and teaching skills and knowledge to begin their ministry. M.Div. students are required to learn methodology of Scriptural analysis and exegesis in the original languages, church history and biblical and systematic theology.

Master of Theological Studies 
The M.T.S. is a 2–year program that presents a curriculum covering many aspects of scriptural analysis and exegetical work in the original languages as well as church history, and biblical and systematic theology.

Unique Model of Seminary Structure

Buildings
NWTS is somewhat unusual in comparison to most seminaries. The institution does not own any buildings, and has no plans to build. NWTS does not have a standard "business model." It does not seek any kind of accreditation but measures itself only on the basis of what it sees as its biblical mission.

Enrollment
Northwest Theological Seminary's enrollment is intentionally limited so it can provide ministerial candidates with "one on one" mentoring.

References

External links
 Northwest Theological Seminary Official website
 Kerux: The Journal of Northwest Theological Seminary Official website and web-archive

Seminaries and theological colleges in Washington (state)
Presbyterian universities and colleges in the United States
Reformed church seminaries and theological colleges
Educational institutions established in 2000
Universities and colleges in Snohomish County, Washington
2000 establishments in Washington (state)